WCMA may refer to:

 WCMA (AM), a radio station (1600 AM) licensed to serve Bayamon, Puerto Rico
 WRXD, a radio station (96.5 FM) licensed to serve Fajardo, Puerto Rico formerly known as WCMA-FM
 WCMA (defunct), a radio station (1560 AM) formerly licensed to serve Daleville, Alabama, United States
 Western Canadian Music Awards, an annual music awards festival to celebrate the music of Western Canada
 Williams College Museum of Art, an art museum at Williams College in Williamstown, Massachusetts, United States